Heinrich Georg "Heinz" Hax (24 January 1900 – 1 September 1969) was a German army general and sportsman.

His sports career was as a German modern pentathlete and sport shooter who competed in the 1932 Summer Olympics and in the 1936 Summer Olympics.  He was a career army officer and a recipient of the Knight's Cross of the Iron Cross with Oak Leaves.  The Knight's Cross of the Iron Cross and its higher grade Oak Leaves was awarded to recognise extreme battlefield bravery or successful military leadership.

Olympic career
In 1928 he finished fifth in the Olympic modern pentathlon.

Four years later he competed as sport shooter and won the silver medal in the 25 metre rapid fire pistol event. In 1936 later he won the silver medal in the same event again.

Awards and decorations
 Iron Cross (1939)
 2nd Class (14 September 1939)
 1st Class (31 October 1939)
 Knight's Cross of the Iron Cross with Oak Leaves
 Knight's Cross on 8 March 1945 as Oberst and leader of 8. Panzer-Division
 (855th) Oak Leaves on 30 April 1945 as Generalmajor and commander of 8. Panzer-Division

Notes

References

Citations

Bibliography

 
 
 

1900 births
1969 deaths
Sportspeople from Berlin
People from the Province of Brandenburg
Major generals of the German Army (Wehrmacht)
German Army personnel of World War I
Reichswehr personnel
Prussian Army personnel
Recipients of the Knight's Cross of the Iron Cross with Oak Leaves
World War II prisoners of war held by the Soviet Union
German prisoners of war in World War II
German male sport shooters
Olympic medalists in shooting
Olympic shooters of Germany
Olympic silver medalists for Germany
Shooters at the 1932 Summer Olympics
Shooters at the 1936 Summer Olympics
ISSF pistol shooters
Olympic modern pentathletes of Germany
Modern pentathletes at the 1928 Summer Olympics
Male modern pentathletes
Medalists at the 1932 Summer Olympics
Medalists at the 1936 Summer Olympics
Major generals of the German Army
Military personnel from Berlin